The massacre of Tamines was the summary executions and mass murder perpetrated by the German army against Belgian civilians in the town of Tamines in Namur, Belgium in the early period of the First World War.

Prelude 
On the morning of August 4, 1914, German cavalry entered Belgian territory. Acting in ordinance with the Schlieffen Plan, written out in 1905, 2 German armies cross Belgium to attack France from the north. Belgium declares the war on Germany for the first time in its history, which causes German armies to rush Belgium on August 3 on the city of Liège, which they seize. On August 8, the cityofficially fell into German hands. The Belgian army, however, put up more resistance than the German strategists had expected. The resistance of the forts, numerous around Liège, slowed down the German advance, their capture resulting in the death of approximately  German soldiers. Liège, however, still fell. This city was the only important barrier on the road to the invasion. This made the first German army able to move towards Brussels, while General Von Bülow, at the head of the second army, continued its route towards Basse-Sambre, in the direction of Namur and Charleroi.
General von Bülow arrived on August 12 at Huy. Upon arrival, Belgian brigade withdrew to Andenne. On 20 August, on the orders of General von Bülow, a German column shot more than two hundred civilians in Andenne. The second German army continued up through the Meuse valley, reaching the Sambre at Namur. They arrive near Tamines, between Namur and Charleroi, on August 20. There, they face multiple French soldiers.

Events 
On Friday 21 August 1914, around 6 AM, a patrol made up of five German uhlans came doing the Ligny road from Sambreville. They had barely reached the town hall when around thirty French soldiers and a few artillerymen from the Civic Guard of Charleroi opened fire and wounded one of the horsemen. The other four went to find reinforcements from Sambreville. The wounded soldier was taken prisoner by the Civic Guard and treated by Doctor Scohy.

An hour later, about thirty more uhlans accompanied by cyclists arrive at the entrance to the village by the Ligny road. Again, the French soldiers returned fire. While this occurred, however, entire detachments of Germans have taken over the Praile district, which was located near the entrance of the village. The tension became high as soldiers threaten to shoot prisoners. Around 8 a.m., an officer ordered five prisoners to go in front of the soldiers to serve as a shield. While this happened, the soldiers fired sporadically at houses and in the street. On the way back, while wounded was being transported by nearby civilians, the French soldiers target the Germans who immediately retaliates. German soldiers then killed an eight-year-old girl and a man. They also set fire to and ransacked a multiple houses in the Praile district.

Later that day, a very long firing squad with five layers of superimposed guns arrive. The first rank of soldiers were tightly crouched. A German officer suddenly leaved the ranks and advanced towards the civilians. He accuses them of having fired on the soldiers. He voiced that as a result, they will be shot.

Around 8:00PM, a whistle sounded, signaling the first shooting. The platoon fires on a compact mass formed by men. As soon as the whistle sounded, the men went to the ground. There were little victims. The Germans then shouted to the men to get up immediately, but nobody moved. A group of soldiers then advanced towards the men lying on the ground. The men, frightened, got up quickly.

As they stood up, a second shooting commences. The soldiers, according to witnesses, used a machine gun. Many people were killed. The soldiers fire irregularly at the men that were still standing

References

1914 in Belgium
1914 murders in Belgium
History of Namur
Tamines
Tamines
Sambreville
World War I memorials in Belgium